Knutna nävar was a communist progg band from Gothenburg, Sweden. They were active during the 1970s.

Discography

 1971 – Internationalen och andra revolutionära arbetarsånger
 1972 – Dom ljuger 
 1972 – Vi slåss för vår framtid 
 1973 – Hör Maskinernas Sång
 1973 – De svarta listornas folk

References 

This article is completely or partly based on material from the Swedish Wikipedia, Knutna nävar(from 03 April 2018).

Swedish rock music groups